These are the results for the men’s singles badminton tournament of 2000 Summer Olympics. The tournament was single-elimination. Matches consisted of three sets, with sets being to 15 for men's singles. The tournament was held at Pavilion 3, Sydney Olympic Park.

Seeds
  (quarterfinals)
  (silver medalist)
  (fourth place)
  (bronze medalist)
  (quarterfinals)
  (second round)
  (gold medalist)
  (quarterfinals)

Draw

Finals

Section 1

Section 2

Section 3

Section 4

References

External links 
 2000 Sydney Olympic Games – Men’s singles

Badminton at the 2000 Summer Olympics
Men's events at the 2000 Summer Olympics